All India Jharkhand Party is a political party in India. The party was founded  by David Munzni on May 19, 1968. Bagun Sumbrai was chosen president and N.E. Horo general secretary.

The membership was predominantly Christian, but there was also a large group of non-Christians. The party was crippled through ethnic fractionalism.

References

Political parties in Jharkhand
Political parties established in 1968
1968 establishments in Bihar